Ann Street runs parallel to Adelaide Street and is the northernmost street in the Brisbane CBD in Queensland, Australia. The street is named for Anne, Queen of Great Britain, as part of the CBD street naming series of female British royalty. It is a major thoroughfare, linking as a four-lane one-way street the suburb of Fortitude Valley in the northeast with the Riverside Expressway in the southwest; house numbers run the opposite direction.

Parks and buildings along Ann Street include the State Law Building, Central Railway Station, Brisbane City Hall, King George Square, King George Central, and also ANZAC Square and the Shrine of Remembrance (both of which commemorate Australia's and New Zealand's war dead). The now demolished Canberra Hotel (1929–1987) was located on the corner of Ann and Edward Streets.

Each year, on Anzac Day (25 April), a dawn memorial service is held at the Shrine of Remembrance, with wreaths being laid around the eternal flame in memory of those who died in conflict. There is also a memorial service held each year on Armistice Day (11 November) and wreaths are again laid at the eternal flame. The shrine was dedicated on Armistice Day in 1930.

King George Square busway station has entrances from King George Square and is accessible from Ann Street.

Ann Street is home to several historic Brisbane churches including St John's Cathedral, Ann Street Church of Christ and St Andrew's Uniting Church. Access to some facilities of All Saints Anglican Church is from Ann Street.

Major intersections

 Riverside Expressway
 North Quay
 George Street
 Roma Street
 Albert Street
 Edward Street
 Creek Street
 Wharf Street
 Queen Street
 Boundary Street
 Gipps Street / Kemp Place
 Brunswick Street
 East Street / James Street
 Murri Way / Commercial Road
 Montpelier Road / Skyring Terrace

History
The United Methodist Free Church opened a church in Ann Street near Wharf Street on Sunday 22 March 1863.

A congregation of the Church of Christ was established on 23 September 1883 in the Brisbane central area. In the late 1890s the congregation purchased 430 Ann Street purchased from the United Methodist Free Church to establish their first church, still operating as at 2021 under the name Your Church.

The Canberra Hotel, erected by the Queensland Prohibition League on the western corner of Ann and Edward Streets, was opened on 20 July 1929 and demolished in 1987.

Heritage listings

Ann Street has a number of heritage-listed sites, including:
 141 Ann Street: Ann Street Presbyterian Church
 166 Ann Street: Brisbane School of Arts
255A Ann Street: ANZAC Square Arcade (former Queensland Government Offices, also known as Anzac Square Building)
 270 Ann Street: Central Railway Station
 301 Ann Street: Shell House
 311 Ann Street: Masonic Temple
 333 Ann Street: former RS Exton and Co Building
 373 Ann Street: St Martin's House
 413 Ann Street: St John's Cathedral
 417 Ann Street: Church House (The Deanery)
 417 Ann Street: The Deanery
 439 Ann Street: Webber House
501 Ann Street: Queensland Brewery Company Building
 547 Ann Street: All Hallows' School Buildings
690 Ann Street: Apothecaries Hall
 740 Ann Street: former Fortitude Valley Post Office
 131 Creek Street: St Andrews Uniting Church (on the corner of Ann Street)
 308 Edward Street: People's Palace (on the corner with Ann Street)
 560 Queen Street: Orient Hotel (on the corner of Ann Street)
 85 Wickham Street: Centenary Place (also borders Ann Street)

See also
160 Ann Street, Brisbane

References

External links

 
Streets in Brisbane